Kazuno Kohara is an author and illustrator of children’s books. She grew up in Japan and now lives in the United Kingdom.

Her books feature linocut illustrations in one or two colors. Her book Ghosts in the House was named a Best Illustrated Children’s Book of 2008 by The New York Times.

Bibliography
 Ghosts in the House!, Roaring Brook Press, 2008
 Here Comes Jack Frost, Roaring Brook Press, 2009
 Little Wizard, Roaring Brook Press, 2010
 The Midnight Library, Roaring Brook Press, 2014

References

Living people
Japanese children's writers
21st-century Japanese women writers
Japanese women children's writers
Japanese expatriates in the United Kingdom
Year of birth missing (living people)